Minutes is Celcom's brand of postpaid mobile service for 2G and 3G network in Malaysia.

About
Customers are able to choose between the option of postpaid or prepaid plans. Celcom offers three different plans: Prime, Premier, or Elite. Celcom's voice revenue in the first half of 2012 grew 6.2% to RM2.31 billion from the previous corresponding period.

See also
Celcom
Xpax

References

External links
Celcom Bhd Official Website

Celcom